Baek Sung-hyun (born January 30, 1989) is a South Korean actor.

Career
Baek Sung-hyun made his acting debut in the 1994 film I Wish for What Is Forbidden to Me when he was five years old. The child actor practically grew up onscreen, playing the roles of an adorable son in several MBC series including See and See Again in 1998 and Ajumma (also known as Housewife's Rebellion) in 2000. As he entered his teenage years, he played the younger versions of male protagonists in dramas such as Damo (2003), Emperor of the Sea (2004) and Stairway to Heaven (2003) — the last his breakout role. Critics praised his acting that seemed more mature and romantic for his age.

Director Lee Joon-ik had previously wanted to cast Baek in his films King and the Clown and The Happy Life; he finally got to work with Lee in Blades of Blood (2010). Lee said he cast Baek as the character Gyun-ja who stands between the two main leads Hwang Jung-min and Cha Seung-won for he was "the only actor who can act as much as he can at such a young age," attesting to Baek's strong acting fundamentals.

He has since starred in a number of other films and TV series — sitcom Kokkiri (Elephant) (2008), high school comedy Our School's E.T. (2008), romantic comedy The Accidental Couple (2009),  and period drama Insu, The Queen Mother (2011).

Of note is Baek's performance as a young marathoner in the four-episode Running, Gu (2010), his acting calm and gravitas in the eight-episode drama special White Christmas (2011), and his leading man turn in the youthful romance Melody of Love (2013).

On January 5, 2022, it was reported that Baek's contract with Sidus HQ has expired since December 2021. On January 25, 2022, Baek signed an exclusive contract with Weta Lab.

Personal life
It has been said that Baek is scheduled to enlist on January 2, 2018, as a Marine Coast Guard to fulfil his mandatory military duties.

Baek married his non-celebrity girlfriend of 4 years on April 25, 2020. At the end of October 2020, Baek's wife gave birth to a daughter. Baek Sung-hyun and his daughter, Seo-yoon were cast members of the KBS2's variety show The Return of Superman.In February 2022, Baek announced that his wife was pregnant with their second child through the program The Return of Superman. Baek's wife gave birth to their second child, a son, at the end of July 2022.

Filmography

Film

Television series

Web series

Variety show

Music video

Theatre/Musical

Awards and nominations

References

1989 births
Living people
South Korean male child actors
South Korean male television actors
South Korean male film actors
South Korean male stage actors
21st-century South Korean male actors
Chung-Ang University alumni